Kris Pearn is an animation director and producer. He has directed films such as Cloudy with a Chance of Meatballs 2 (2013, and along with Cody Cameron) and The Willoughbys (2020).

Early life and education 

Pearn was born in Ontario, Canada, where his family owns a small donkey farm. Pearn attended the Strathroy District Collegiate Institute.

Career 

Pearn's storyboarding for Open Season (2006) earned him an Annie nomination for "Storyboarding in an Animated Feature Production".

Pearn and Cody Cameron co-directed Cloudy with a Chance of Meatballs 2 (2013), the first director credit for each. The duo took over from directing team Phil Lord and Christopher Miller, announced as directors in December 2011. The voices of the Shrimpanzees, Sentinel Peter, and Labcoat Jenny were provided by Pearn. The duo received a nomination for Satellite Award for Best Animated or Mixed Media Feature.

Pearn's storyboard work for Arthur Christmas earned him an Annie Award nomination for "Storyboarding in a Feature Production". He was also the voice of one of the elves in the film.

Pearn returned to the Open Season film series, working on the story of Open Season: Scared Silly (2015).

Pearn directed The Willoughbys (2020), a computer-animated comedy released on Netflix. Pearn also developed the story, and co-wrote the screenplay with Mark Stanleigh. He was brought onto the production four years before its release, securing distribution by Netflix early in their venture into commissioning animation. While the source book made fun of children's literature, he pivoted the production to poke at children's movie tropes. Pearn and character designer Craig Kellman had worked together previously, but he suggests that this was the first time they "could really do whatever we craved." The film's score is by Mark Mothersbaugh, who had previously worked with Pearn on Cloudy 2.

He has taught Character Design at Sheridan College in Oakville, Ontario. Away from animation, Pearn has illustrated the book Project Superhero'', written by E. Paul Zehr, a professor of kinesiology and neuroscience. The two met at TEDxEdmonton 2012 where Zehr was giving a talk on "the superhero in you".

References

External links
 

Living people
Canadian animated film directors
Film directors from Ontario
Academic staff of Sheridan College
Year of birth missing (living people)